Elfriede Wäger (born 3 April 1946) is an Austrian luger. She competed in the women's singles event at the 1968 Winter Olympics.

References

1946 births
Living people
Austrian female lugers
Olympic lugers of Austria
Lugers at the 1968 Winter Olympics
People from Feldkirch District
Sportspeople from Vorarlberg